Clean Out is a 2003 Sri Lankan Sinhala comedy film directed by Roy de Silva and produced by Sunil Aruna Weerasiri for Aruna Kanthi Films. It stars Rodney Warnakula, Priyantha Seneviratne and Ananda Wickramage in lead roles along with Anusha Damayanthi and Vasanthi Gunaratne. Music composed by Sangeeth Wickramasinghe. It is the 1026th Sri Lankan film in the Sinhala cinema.

Plot

Cast
 Rodney Warnakula as Wickie
 Priyantha Seneviratne as Rocky
 Ananda Wickramage as Reggie
 Anusha Damayanthi as Rosalyn
 Vasanthi Gunaratne as Nandani
 Tennyson Cooray as Bookie
 Sunil Hettiarachchi as Rosalyn's father
 Rajitha Hiran as Familia's servant
 Nilanthi Dias as Familia
 Suraj Mapa as Pathale Sudha 'Sam'
 Ronnie Leitch as Japan Thattaya
 Tyrone Michael as Sudha's henchman
 Wasantha Kumaravila as Sudha's henchman
 Ranjith G. Perera as Lawyer Perera
 Mangala Premaratne as Store employee
 Teddy Vidyalankara as Sudha's extra henchman
 Sumana Amarasinghe

Soundtrack

References

2003 films
2000s Sinhala-language films
2003 comedy films
Sri Lankan comedy films